The 2007–08 Purefoods Tender Juicy Giants season was the 20th season of the franchise in the Philippine Basketball Association (PBA).

Key dates
August 19: The 2007 PBA Draft took place at Market! Market! in Bonifacio Global City, Taguig.

Roster

Depth chart

Philippine Cup

Team standings
Legend:
y-Qualified for semifinals
x-Qualified for quarterfinals
w-Qualified for the wildcard phase
e-Eliminated

Game log

|- bgcolor="#bbffbb"

|- bgcolor="#bbffbb"
|- bgcolor="#bbffbb"
| 1
| October 17
| Sta.Lucia
| 96-89
| J. Yap (29)
| 
| 
| Araneta Coliseum
| 1–0
|- bgcolor="#bbffbb"
| 2
| October 20
| Talk 'N Text
| 112-97
| Raymundo (25) J. Yap (24)
|  
| 
| Dumaguete
| 2–0
|- bgcolor="#bbffbb"
| 3
| October 26
| Magnolia
| 93-90
| J. Yap (25)
| 
| 
| Araneta Coliseum
| 3–0

|- bgcolor="#bbffbb"
| 4
| November 2
| Welcoat
| 87-77
| J. Yap (28)
| 
| 
| Cuneta Astrodome
| 4–0 
|- bgcolor="#bbffbb"
| 5
| November 4
| Brgy.Ginebra
| 103-76
| Simon (27)
| 
| 
| Cuneta Astrodome
| 5–0
|- bgcolor="#bbffbb"
| 6
| November 9
| Coca Cola
| 88-86
| Raymundo (21)
| 
| 
| Ynares Center
| 6–0
|- bgcolor="#bbffbb"
| 7
| November 14
| Air21
| 100-81
| Simon (22)
| 
|  
| Araneta Coliseum
| 7–0
|- bgcolor="#edbebf"
| 8
| November 17
| Red Bull
| 74–87
| J. Yap (23) 
| 
| 
| Tacloban City
| 7–1
|- bgcolor="#bbffbb"
| 9
| November 21
| Alaska
| 87-86
| J. Yap (23) 
| 
| 
| Araneta Coliseum
| 8–1
|-bgcolor="#bbffbb"
| 10
| November 25
| Sta.Lucia
| 84-81
| J. Yap (16)
| 
| 
| Araneta Coliseum
| 9–1
|-bgcolor="#edbebf"
| 11
| November 30
| Magnolia
| 86–108
| Lanete (19)
| 
| 
| Ynares Center
| 9–2

|-bgcolor="#edbebf"
| 12
| December 7
| Talk 'N Text
| 98–101
| J. Yap (25)
| 
| 
| Cuneta Astrodome
| 9–3
|-bgcolor="#bbffbb"
| 13
| December 9
| Welcoat
| 92-80
| Raymundo (21) J. Yap (21)
| 
| 
| Cuneta Astrodome
| 10–3
|-bgcolor="#bbffbb"
| 14
| December 15
| Air21
| 114-92
| J. Yap (25)
| 
| 
| Bacolod
| 11–3
|-bgcolor="#edbebf"
| 15
| December 25
| Brgy.Ginebra
| 98–100
| J. Yap (20) Raymundo (20)
| 
| 
| Araneta Coliseum
| 11–4

|- bgcolor="#bbffbb"
| 16
| January 6
| Coca Cola
| 101-87
| J. Yap (29)
|
| 
| Araneta Coliseum
| 12–4
|- bgcolor="#edbebf"
| 17
| January 11
| Alaska
| 
| 
| 
| 
| Araneta Coliseum
| 12–5
|- bgcolor="#edbebf"
| 18
| January 16
| Red Bull
| 84–97
| J. Yap (22)
| 
| 
| Cuneta Astrodome
| 12–6

Fiesta Conference

Game log

|- bgcolor="#bbffbb"
| 1
| April 2
| Magnolia
| 127-126 (2OT)
| Rice (56)
| 
| 
| Araneta Coliseum
| 1–0
|- bgcolor="#edbebf"
| 2
| April 5
| Coca Cola
| 108–109
| Rice (37)
|  
| 
| Parañaque
| 1–1
|- bgcolor="#bbffbb"
| 3
| April 9
| Air21
| 102-94
| J. Yap (25)
| 
| 
| Araneta Coliseum
| 2–1
|- bgcolor="#edbebf"
| 4
| April 16
| Red Bull
| 96–98
| Rice (31)
| 
| 
| Araneta Coliseum
| 2–2 
|- bgcolor="#edbebf"
| 5
| April 20
| Welcoat
| 103–110
| 
| 
| 
| Araneta Coliseum
| 2–3

|- bgcolor="#edbebf"
| 6
| May 2
| Brgy.Ginebra
| 99–102
| 
| 
| 
| Araneta Coliseum
| 2–4
|- bgcolor="#bbffbb"
| 7
| May 10
| Alaska
| 88-78
| J. Yap (24)
| 
|  
| Calape, Bohol
| 3–4
|- bgcolor="#edbebf"
| 8
| May 16
| Magnolia
| 81–88
| Villanueva (18) 
| 
| 
| Araneta Coliseum
| 3–5
|- bgcolor="#bbffbb"
| 9
| May 21
| Talk 'N Text
| 84-79
| 
| 
| 
| Ynares Center
| 4–5
|-bgcolor="#bbffbb"
| 10
| May 25
| Sta.Lucia
| 82-74
| 
| 
| 
| Cuneta Astrodome
| 5–5
|-bgcolor="#edbebf"
| 11
| May 30
| Alaska
| 60–88
| Rhalimi (13)
| 
| 
| Ynares Center
| 5–6

|-bgcolor="#bbffbb"
| 12
| June 4
| Coca Cola
| 100-98
| J. Yap (31)
| 
| 
| Araneta Coliseum
| 6–6
|-bgcolor="#edbebf"
| 13
| June 7
| Welcoat
| 97–102
| Rhalimi (21) 
| 
| 
| Lanao del Norte
| 6–7
|-bgcolor="#edbebf"
| 14
| June 11
| Brgy.Ginebra
| 81–89
| Rhalimi (28) 
| Rhalimi (15)
| 
| Araneta Coliseum
| 6–8
|-bgcolor="#bbffbb"
| 15
| June 15
| Red Bull
| 93-91
| J. Yap (25) 
| 
| 
| Araneta Coliseum
| 7–8
|-bgcolor="#edbebf"
| 16
| June 20
| Talk 'N Text
| 101–102
| Rhalimi (21) 
| 
| 
| Cuneta Astrodome
| 7–9
|-bgcolor="#bbffbb"
| 17
| June 27
| Sta.Lucia
| 104-89
|  
| 
| 
| Araneta Coliseum
| 8–9

|-bgcolor="#edbebf"
| 18
| July 2
| Air21
| 103–113
| J. Yap (24)
| 
| 
| Araneta Coliseum
| 8–10

Transactions

Trades

References

Magnolia Hotshots seasons
Purefoods